The River Farset (An Fhearsaid or Abhainn na Feirste in Irish) is a river in Belfast, Northern Ireland.  It is a late tributary of the River Lagan.

Course
Rising on Squire's Hill on the north-western edge of Belfast, the River Farset is on the County Antrim side of the Lagan, and its entry to the Lagan is close to that river's outflow into Belfast Lough. The Farset is now contained within a tunnel under Belfast's High Street supposedly big enough to take a bus.

History
Belfast was founded at a sandy ford across the Farset, and this is the origin of the city's name - Béal Feirste, the "river mouth of the sandbar". Farset itself is derived from the Irish word for "sandbar". The river flowed beside docks on High Street as Belfast grew in the 19th century.

In the 17th, 18th, and 19th centuries, the river was sometimes known as Belfast River, the River of Belfast, the Town River, or the High Street River. Over the course of the 18th century it was gradually covered over; the final section, close to Princes Street, was culverted in 1804.

See also
List of rivers of Northern Ireland

References

Rivers of County Antrim
Geography of Belfast